The 1983 Irish Masters was the ninth edition of the professional invitational snooker tournament, which took place from 22 to 27 March 1983. The tournament was played at Goffs in Kill, County Kildare, and featured twelve professional players.

Steve Davis won the title for the first time, beating Ray Reardon 9–2 in the final.

Main draw

References

Irish Masters
Irish Masters
Irish Masters
Irish Masters